

93001–93100 

|-id=061
| 93061 Barbagallo ||  || Mariano Barbagallo (1933–2005), a former colleague and friend of co-discoverer Ermes Colombini, was a retiree of a bank and an exemplary Italian father, patient and generous with his four sons. || 
|}

93101–93200 

|-id=102
| 93102 Leroy ||  || Valère Leroy (born 1961), a French physical sciences teacher and amateur astronomer has also been an active member of the Rouen Observatory for more than 20 years. He has been very devoted to bringing young people to astronomy and communicates his passion to them. || 
|-id=164
| 93164 Gordontelepun ||  || Gordon Telepun (born 1957), an American amateur astronomer and observer of solar eclipses who lives in Decatur, Alabama. He is a cosmetic and reconstructive surgeon and graduated from Boston University School of Medicine. || 
|}

93201–93300 

|-id=256
| 93256 Stach ||  ||  (born 1988) is a Czech journalist covering science. In the last five years he has moderated a TV show where he interviewed 15 Nobel Prize laureates and many other leading world scientists. He has been awarded the Vojtěch Náprstek Medal for achievements in popularizing science from the Czech Academy of Sciences. || 
|}

93301–93400 

|-bgcolor=#f2f2f2
| colspan=4 align=center | 
|}

93401–93500 

|-bgcolor=#f2f2f2
| colspan=4 align=center | 
|}

93501–93600 

|-bgcolor=#f2f2f2
| colspan=4 align=center | 
|}

93601–93700 

|-bgcolor=#f2f2f2
| colspan=4 align=center | 
|}

93701–93800 

|-bgcolor=#f2f2f2
| colspan=4 align=center | 
|}

93801–93900 

|-bgcolor=#f2f2f2
| colspan=4 align=center | 
|}

93901–94000 

|-bgcolor=#f2f2f2
| colspan=4 align=center | 
|}

References 

093001-094000